Federico García Lorca or the Monument to Federico García Lorca is an instance of public art in Madrid, Spain. Located at the Plaza de Santa Ana, in front of the Teatro Español, it consists of a bronze statue of the aforementioned poet and playwright.

History and description 

It was subsequently stored for about a decade at the Cuartel del Conde-Duque, during the reform works of its intended location, the Plaza de Santa Ana.

The full body bronze statue representing the poet is looking at the Teatro Español, while holding a lark about to take off between his hands. Larks and nightingales are common motifs in his poems.

The inscription reads  ("Madrid, to Federico García Lorca").

Still a symbol of the polarized past of Spain by the turn of the 21st century, according to David Crocker "the statue, at least, is still an emblem of the contested past: each day, the Left puts a red kerchief on the neck of the statue, and someone from the Right comes later to take it off". In April 2011, during a vandal attack, the lark was removed from his hands.

References

Citations

Bibliography
 
 

Bronze sculptures in Spain
Outdoor sculptures in Madrid
Monuments and memorials in Madrid
Statues of writers
Sculptures of men in Spain
Buildings and structures in Cortes neighborhood, Madrid
Vandalized works of art in Spain